Powerhouse is the third full-length album by Swedish heavy metal band Mustasch. It was released in 2005, and peaked at number 10 on the Swedish charts.

Track listing 
"Haunted By Myself" - 4:13
"Accident Black Spot" - 3:33
"Frosty White" - 3:54
"Dogwash" - 3:04
"Turn It Down" - 2:49
"Life On Earth" - 5:36
"Powerhouse" - 3:26
"I Lied" - 4:23
"I'm Alright" - 3:28
"Evil Doer" - 2:58
"In The Deep - October" - 8:01

References

2005 albums
Mustasch albums